Daniel Schulman may refer to:

 Dan Schulman (born 1958), American businessperson
 Daniel Schulman (writer), American author and journalist
 Daniel Schulman (curator), American curator, formerly of the Art Institute of Chicago

See also
 Joseph Daniel Schulman, American physician
 Daniel Shulman (disambiguation)